Quinolinate synthase (NadA, QS, quinolinate synthetase) is an enzyme with systematic name glycerone phosphate:iminosuccinate alkyltransferase (cyclizing). This enzyme catalyses the following chemical reaction

 glycerone phosphate + iminosuccinate  pyridine-2,3-dicarboxylate + 2 H2O + phosphate

This iron-sulfur protein that requires a [4Fe-4S] cluster for activity.

References

External links 

EC 2.5.1